Vila vid denna källa (English: Rest by this well) is an album by Swedish folk singer-songwriter and guitar player Fred Åkerström, named for an 18th-century song of the same name. It's a third album of Fred Åkerström's interpretations of Carl Michael Bellman's Fredman's Epistles.

Track listing
Songs and lyrics by Carl Michael Bellman.

 Epistle Nr 9: Käraste Bröder, Systrar och Vänner 3:38
 Epistle Nr 82: Vila Vid Denna Källa 8:56
 Epistle Nr 67: Fader Movitz Bror 3:06
 Epistle Nr 43: Värm Mer Öl Och Bröd 3:22
 Epistle Nr 45: Tjänare, Mollberg, Hur Är Det Fatt 3:48
 Epistle Nr 33: Stolta Stad! 7:50
 Epistle Nr 44: Movitz Helt Allena 4:27
 Epistle Nr 31: Se Movitz, Vi Står Du Och Gråter 5:06
 Epistle Nr 27: Gubben Är Gammal, Urverket Dras 3:04

References

1977 albums
Fred Åkerström albums
Swedish-language albums
Carl Michael Bellman